Tuapeijat (also spelled Tuapejat or Tua Pejat) is a town within North Sipora District (Kecamatan Sipora Utara) in the Mentawai Islands Regency of West Sumatra province of Indonesia and it is the administrative seat (capital) of Mentawai Islands Regency. The population was 4,344 at the 2010 Census, and the 2015 estimate gave the population as 5,756. The town's jurisdiction includes three small islands of Siburu, Silabok and Pototoga in addition to the main town areas on Sipora Island.

Climate
Tuapejat has a tropical rainforest climate (Af) with heavy to very heavy rainfall year-round.

References

Populated places in West Sumatra
Regency seats of West Sumatra
Mentawai Islands Regency